is a feminine Japanese given name and a masculine Croatian name. It can have many different meanings in Japanese depending on the kanji used.

Possible Japanese writings
Miho can be written using different kanji characters and can mean:
実穂, "truth, ear of grain"
美穂, "beauty, ear of grain"
美保, "beauty, care"
未歩, "future (part of the word 未来), step"
美帆, "beauty, sail"
美歩, "beauty, walk"

The name can also be written in hiragana "みほ" or katakana　“ミホ”.

People with the name
 , Japanese sprint canoeist
 , Japanese voice actress
 Miho Bošković (born 1983), Croatian water polo player
 Miho Dukov (born 1955), former Bulgarian wrestler
 , Japanese actress
 , Japanese singer
 , Japanese football player
 , Japanese table tennis player
 , Japanese singer and songwriter
 , Japanese composer and jazz musician
 Miho Iwata (born 1962), Japanese performance artist, scenographer and choreographer
 , former Japanese football player
 , Japanese actress and J-pop singer
 , Japanese J-pop singer
 , Japanese former synchronized swimmer
 Miho Klaić (1829–1896), Croatian politician and a leader of the Croatian revival in Dalmatia
 , former Japanese pop singer-songwriter
 , Japanese actress
 , Japanese football player
 , Japanese women's basketball player
 , Japanese idol singer, AKB48 member
 , Japanese singer and model
 Miho Mosulishvili (born 1962), Georgian writer and playwright
 , retired Japanese volleyball player
 , Japanese actress, model, and a former J-pop idol singer
 , Japanese actress
 Miho Nishida (born 1992), Filipino-born Japanese actress
 , Japanese climber
 , Japanese  manga artist
 , Japanese voice actress
 , Japanese military officer
 , Japanese actress
 , Japanese ice hockey player
 , Japanese actress and essayist
 , Japanese swimmer
 , Japanese politician
 , Japanese badminton player
 , Japanese swimmer
 Miho Watanabe
 , Japanese popular music artist, actor, and dancer
 , Japanese violinist
 , one of the members of Japanese idol group Hinatazaka46
 , Japanese voice actress
 , Japanese rhythmic gymnast
 , Japanese cyclist

Fictional characters
 Miho, female lead of the anime Fancy Lala
 Miho, a character from the Saint Seiya manga/anime
 Miho, a character from the graphic novel series Sin City
 Miho, a character from the video game Vainglory
 Miho Amakata, a character from Free!
 Miho Azuki, a character from the manga/anime series Bakuman
 Miho Karasuma, a character from Witch Hunter Robin
 Miho Kirishima, Kamen Rider Femme from the tokusatsu TV series Kamen Rider Ryuki
 Miho Kohinata, a character from The Idolmaster Cinderella Girls
 Miho Maruyama, a character from 'Ojamajo Doremi Miho Mukai, a character from Noein Miho Nishizumi, a character from Girls und Panzer Miho Nosaka, a character from the manga/anime series Yu-Gi-Oh! Miho Odagiri, a character from Hot Gimmick Miho Shinjo, a character from the videogame Front Mission 3 Miho Tohya, a character from Megatokyo Miho, a monster in the popular mobile game Summoners War''.

See also
　, village in Ibaraki Prefecture, Japan
　Miho Museum in Shiga Prefecture, Japan
　, in Tottori Prefecture, Japan
　, a National Place of Scenic Beauty in Shizuoka Prefecture, Japan

Japanese feminine given names
Croatian masculine given names